Derek Lowe is a medicinal chemist working on preclinical drug discovery in the pharmaceutical industry.  Lowe has published a blog about this field, "In the Pipeline", since 2002 and is a columnist for the Royal Society of Chemistry's Chemistry World.

Biography 
Lowe (born in Harrisburg, Arkansas) got his BA from Hendrix College and his PhD in organic chemistry from Duke University on synthesis of natural products, before spending time in Germany on a Humboldt Fellowship.

Lowe was the one of the first people to blog from inside the pharmaceutical industry, with the approval of his supervisor and the company legal department, and one of the first science bloggers. By 2006, his blog had between 3,000 and 4,000 visitors per day during the workweek; he covered business matters, trends and issues in medicinal chemistry, and legal matters like patent law and regulation. At that time he was working at a pharmaceutical company doing hit to lead medical chemistry work.  his blog received between 15,000 and 20,000 page views on a typical weekday.  His response to a 2013 article in BuzzFeed that propagated chemophobia was widely cited.

He serves on the editorial board of ACS Medicinal Chemistry Letters and on the advisory board of Chemical & Engineering News.

 he was working at Novartis; formerly he had worked for 10 years at Vertex, 9 years at Bayer, and 8 years at Schering-Plough.

Notable publications

Book

Selected scientific papers

Selected blogs or commentary 
  (1st post)
 
  Cited in 

 ,

References

External links 
Lowe's "In the Pipeline" blog
Columns at Chemistry World

Reddit AMA, 28 February 2014

Science blogs
21st-century American chemists
Drug discovery
Hendrix College alumni
Duke University alumni
Living people
People from Harrisburg, Arkansas
Year of birth missing (living people)